David Mathieson (born 18 January 1978 in Dumfries, Scotland) is a retired Scottish professional association footballer. A goalkeeper. Mathieson played for Queen of the South and Gretna and made three appearances for Scotland under-21s.

Queen of the South

David Mathieson joined a Queen of the South in 1996 with new chairman Norman Blount getting the wheels moving on the club's revival.

In 1997 Queen of the South reached the Scottish Challenge Cup final for the first time. Second Division Queens lost 1-0 to 1st Division Falkirk despite a rousing Queens display at Motherwell's Fir Park; a performance that included the man of the match award going to Queens veteran central midfield playmaker Tommy Bryce and an early career appearance for Jamie McAllister. A late chance for a Derek Townsley equaliser went agonisingly over for Queens. David Mathieson played in goals for Queens.

At the end of season 1998-99 David Mathieson was the Queen of the South fan club player of the year. While at Queen of the South David Mathieson gained 3 Scotland under 21 caps. The opponents were Latvia, Colombia and Germany. Mathieson left Palmerston Park in 2001 after five seasons.

Gretna

After leaving Palmerston Park he rejoined the former Queens player and manager, Rowan Alexander who was now the manager of non-league club Gretna. Gretna however successfully applied for admission to the Scottish League in 2002. The club were soon taken over by millionaire Brooks Mileson. Bank-rolled by Mileson, Gretna embarked upon an ambitious recruitment strategy. With high calibre players for the division on board, Mathieson picked up the 2005 Scottish Third Division championship. Mathieson then found himself out of favour when the club signed former St Johnstone goalkeeper Alan Main. Mathieson only had four appearances in season 2005-06 and his final appearance was in the Scottish Challenge Cup, early in season 2006-07.

Coaching career
In February 2022, Mathieson was appointed Queen of the South's goalkeeping coach. This was after Ross Ballantyne departed the Doonhamers alongside the management team of Allan Johnston and Sandy Clark.

Honours

 Queen of the South — 1997 Scottish Challenge Cup Final Runner Up
 Gretna — 2004–05 Scottish Third Division Winner

References

External links

Living people
1978 births
Scottish footballers
St Johnstone F.C. players
Queen of the South F.C. players
Gretna F.C. players
Scottish Football League players
Association football goalkeepers
Scotland under-21 international footballers
Footballers from Dumfries
St Cuthbert Wanderers F.C. players
Rangers F.C. players